Convention Center station is a station of the Green and Silver Lines on the San Diego Trolley. It is located in the Marina District section of the city, which features a variety of waterfront apartments just west of Downtown. The San Diego Convention Center is located adjacent to the station, and Petco Park is less than half a mile away. This station opened June 30, 1990 as part of the Orange Line's (then called the East Line) Bayside Extension.

It was closed from April 9 through July 2012 to undergo renovations as part of the Trolley Renewal Project.

On September 2, 2012, service to this station by the Orange Line was replaced by the Green Line as part of a system redesign.

Station layout
There are two tracks, each with a side platform. A third track handles freight operations on the line. Silver Line heritage service operates Friday through Sunday only.

See also
 List of San Diego Trolley stations

References

Green Line (San Diego Trolley)
Silver Line (San Diego Trolley)
San Diego Trolley stations in San Diego
Railway stations in the United States opened in 1986
1986 establishments in California